The Tamil Eelam national football team a representative football team for Tamil Eelam. The team, which consists of professional and semi-professional drawn from the Sri Lankan Tamil diaspora community in Canada and Europe, was established in 2012 by the Tamileelam Football Association (TEFA). TEFA is affiliated to the Confederation of Independent Football Associations, an umbrella association for entities unaffiliated with FIFA therefore cannot compete for the FIFA World Cup and the AFC Asian Cup since they are not affiliated with the Asian Football Confederation (AFC). As of March 2020, the team was ranked 16th in the CONIFA World ranking.

History
The Tamileelam Football Association was established by the Global Tamil Youth League on 8 April 2012. The Tamil Eelam national football team made its international debut at the 2012 VIVA World Cup held in Iraqi Kurdistan, finishing in 7th place. The team took part in the Tynwald Hill International Football Tournament History held on the Isle of Man in July 2013, finishing in 3rd place. The team took part in the 2014 ConIFA World Football Cup held in the Sápmi region.

World Cup record

Tynwald Hill International Football Tournament

Recent results

2019

Current squad
The following players are members of the current squad. They have played in the recent CONIFA 2020 WFC qualification matches. The CONIFA 2020 World Football Cup has been cancelled due to the unprecedented disruption of the coronavirus pandemic.

See also
 Transnational Government of Tamil Eelam
 Tamil Eelam national cricket team
 World Tamil Conference
 World Classical Tamil Conference 2010

References

External links
 
 

Association football clubs established in 2012
Football national